The Badminton Horse Trials is a five-day event, one of only six annual Concours Complet International (CCI) Five Star events as classified by the Fédération Équestre Internationale (FEI). It takes place in April or May each year in the park of Badminton House, the seat of the Duke of Beaufort in South Gloucestershire, England.

History
Badminton was first held in 1949 by the 10th Duke of Beaufort in order to let British riders train for international events, and was advertised as "the most important horse event in Britain".  It was the second three-day event held in Britain, with the first being its inspiration – the 1948 Summer Olympics.  The first Badminton had 22 horses from Britain and Ireland start, and was won by Golden Willow.  Eight of the 22 starters failed to complete the cross-country course.  Badminton was the home of the first European Championship in 1953, won by Major Laurence Rook on Starlight XV.  In 1955, Badminton moved to Windsor Castle for a year, at the invitation of the Queen, in order to hold the second European Championships.  Badminton was first televised in 1956.

In 1959, Badminton was held in two sections, called the Great and Little Badminton, due to the popularity of the event and the number of entries.  The horses in the two sections jumped the same fences, but were separated into the two divisions based on their money winnings. This graded approach was abandoned after the 1965 event.
In 1989, the current director and course-designer Hugh Thomas, who rode in the 1976 Montreal Olympics, took over from Francis Weldon, a former winner, who is credited with bringing the event to the pinnacle it is at today.

Badminton is held in the 6 square kilometre (1500 acre) Badminton Park, where the car parks, tradestands, arena and cross-country courses are located.

Badminton has been cancelled on several occasions – in 1966, 1975, 1987, 2001, 2012, 2020 and 2021 the event was cancelled completely, and in 1963 it was downgraded to a one-day event due to bad weather. In 2001 it was cancelled due to foot and mouth disease, in 2012 due to waterlogged ground, and in 2020 and 2021 due to the COVID-19 pandemic.

Status

Together with the five-star rated Kentucky Three-Day Event and the Burghley Horse Trials, Badminton forms the Rolex Grand Slam of Eventing. Only two people have ever won the Grand Slam; Pippa Funnell in 2003 and Michael Jung in 2015/16. Australian Andrew Hoy nearly took the title in 2007 but lost it when he had a pole down at Burghley. The remaining CCI***** rated events are the Luhmühlen Horse Trials, the Australian International Three Day Event and the Stars of Pau.  It is also now part of the HSBC FEI Classics—a points-based system containing the CCI***** events.

The cross-country day at Badminton attracts crowds of up to a quarter of a million and is the second largest in the world for money made (after the Indianapolis 500).

Winners

Casualties

1976
Wideawake ridden by Lucinda Green died of a heart attack on his victory lap.

2010
 Desert Island ridden by Louisa Lockwood, euthanised after breaking a fetlock.

2007
 Skwal ridden by Andrew Downes died of a suspected heart attack in the finishing ring 
 Icare d’Auzay ridden by Jean-Lou Bigot died after a fence flag marker pole pierced an artery.

2018

 Redpath Ransom ridden by Alexander Bragg, euthanised after suffering a major injury to a suspensory ligament during cross country, unrelated to a jump.

Criticism

In 2007, after a long period without rain, the ground was considered to be too hard, resulting in 22 withdrawals.

References

External links
Badminton Horse Trials website

Eventing
Equestrian sports in the United Kingdom
Sport in Gloucestershire
Equestrian sports in England